Klaus-Dieter Tafelmeier (born 12 April 1958 in Singen, Baden-Württemberg) is a retired German javelin thrower. He represented Bayer 04 Leverkusen.

In September 1986, Tafelmeier threw 85.74 metres in Como to record the first official world record for the new javelin type. The record lasted until May 1987 when Jan Železný threw 87.66 metres. Tafelmeier later established a career best throw of 86.64 metres in Gelsenkirchen. This ranks him seventh among German javelin throwers with the new implement, behind Johannes Vetter, Thomas Röhler, Raymond Hecht, Boris Henry, Peter Blank and Peter Esenwein.

Achievements

Seasonal bests by year
1986 - 85.74
1987 - 86.64
1988 - 82.72

References

1958 births
Living people
People from Singen
Sportspeople from Freiburg (region)
West German male javelin throwers
Athletes (track and field) at the 1984 Summer Olympics
Athletes (track and field) at the 1988 Summer Olympics
Olympic athletes of West Germany
European Athletics Championships medalists